Walbran Island is an island in the Central Coast region of British Columbia, Canada.  It is located on the northwest side of Rivers Inlet near its mouth into Fitz Hugh Sound.

History
It is named after John Thomas Walbran.  He was the author of British Columbia Coast Names, which was published in 1909 and is still a valuable reference on the subject.

References

Central Coast of British Columbia
Islands of British Columbia